Mountain is a town in Oconto County, Wisconsin, United States. The population was 860 at the 2000 census. The census-designated place of Mountain is located within the town. The unincorporated communities of Bonita and Mountain are located in the town.

History
This town was named Armstrong until August 1997, when the name was changed to Mountain.

Geography
According to the United States Census Bureau, the town has a total area of 72.7 square miles (188.2 km2), of which, 71.6 square miles (185.4 km2) of it is land and 1.1 square miles (2.8 km2) of it (1.51%) is water.

Demographics
As of the census of 2000, there were 860 people, 380 households, and 248 families residing in the town. The population density was 12.0 people per square mile (4.6/km2). There were 883 housing units at an average density of 12.3 per square mile (4.8/km2). The racial makeup of the town was 98.26% White, 0.47% Native American, 0.35% Asian, and 0.93% from two or more races. Hispanic or Latino of any race were 0.35% of the population.

There were 380 households, out of which 22.1% had children under the age of 18 living with them, 55.3% were married couples living together, 5.8% had a female householder with no husband present, and 34.7% were non-families. 30.0% of all households were made up of individuals, and 16.1% had someone living alone who was 65 years of age or older. The average household size was 2.26 and the average family size was 2.76.

In the town, the population was spread out, with 21.5% under the age of 18, 6.0% from 18 to 24, 22.6% from 25 to 44, 27.7% from 45 to 64, and 22.2% who were 65 years of age or older. The median age was 45 years. For every 100 females, there were 99.1 males. For every 100 females age 18 and over, there were 99.1 males.

The median income for a household in the town was $30,598, and the median income for a family was $35,341. Males had a median income of $27,321 versus $20,208 for females. The per capita income for the town was $16,440. About 8.6% of families and 10.4% of the population were below the poverty line, including 13.0% of those under age 18 and 3.0% of those age 65 or over.

References

Towns in Oconto County, Wisconsin
Green Bay metropolitan area
Towns in Wisconsin